Tom Christian Merkens (born 20 January 1990) is a German footballer who currently plays for TSV Havelse.

External links

Tom Christian Merkens at Kicker

1990 births
Living people
German footballers
Hannover 96 II players
VfL Osnabrück players
3. Liga players
Association football midfielders
TSV Havelse players